Cory Daniel (born 11 September 1995) is an American rugby union player, currently playing for the . His preferred position is flanker or number 8.

Early career
Daniel is from Silver Springs, Maryland and attended the University of North Carolina. Originally a wrestler, he switched sports to rugby in 2020.

Professional career
Daniel originally signed for Old Glory DC as a crossover athlete in 2020. He didn't debut with the side until the following season and has remained with the side since.

Daniel was selected for the USA Falcons XV in 2022 for their tour to South Africa. He made his debut for the full United States side in 2022, making his debut against Kenya.

References

External links
itsrugby.co.uk Profile

1995 births
Living people
American rugby union players
United States international rugby union players
Rugby union flankers
Rugby union number eights
Old Glory DC players